Pulham is a village in Dorset, England.

Pulham may also refer to:

Places in England 

Pulham, Dorset
Pulham Market, Norfolk
Pulham St Mary, Norfolk
RNAS Pulham Airship station, Norfolk

Companies 

 James Pulham and Son, landscape gardeners and terracotta manufacturers